Sarcoxie Public Square Historic District is a national historic district located at Sarcoxie, Jasper County, Missouri.   The district encompasses 26 contributing buildings, 1 contributing site, and 1 contributing structure in the central business district of Sarcoxie.  It developed between about 1890 and 1965 and includes representative examples of commercial style architecture. Notable contributing resources include the Public Square and Gazebo (c. 1840, 1904); Sarcoxie Record (1889), Sarcoxie City Hall (c. 1900-1908), Sarcoxie Police (c. 1900), Parmley Garage (1910-1911), Sarcoxie Public Library (c. 1900), and Gene Taylor Library & Museum (c. 1894).

It was listed on the National Register of Historic Places in 2015.

References

Historic districts on the National Register of Historic Places in Missouri
Buildings and structures in Jasper County, Missouri
National Register of Historic Places in Jasper County, Missouri